Argue with a Tree... is a double live album/concert film by Blue October. It is their first live album and their fourth CD overall. The title of the album is a lyric in the song "Weight of the World". The album was recorded live on June 4, 2004 at Lakewood Theater in Dallas, Texas. It was released as a double CD and DVD in the United States in September 2004, by Brando/Universal Records. 

The set includes live versions of songs from all of Blue October's studio albums at the time, as well as the then unreleased tracks "PRN" and "18th Floor Balcony", and early versions of "Weight of the World" and "Sound of Pulling Heaven Down".  A studio version of "PRN" was eventually released in 2015 on Ryan Delahoussaye's solo debut Tufstrings. "18th Floor Balcony" and "Sound of Pulling Heaven Down" were released on Foiled in 2006, and "Weight of the World" was the opening track on 2009's Approaching Normal. Argue With a Tree... is the only Blue October release to feature bass guitarist Piper Skih.

Track listing

CD 1
"Retarded Disfigured Clown (Intro)" / "Amnesia" – 4:59
"Independently Happy" – 5:25
"H.R.S.A." – 4:33
"Drop" – 4:24
"Sexual Powertrip" – 3:41
"Clumsy Card House" – 4:07
"Blue Sunshine" – 6:13
"Balance Beam" – 4:01
"Quiet Mind" – 4:23
"Inner Glow" – 4:17
"Ugly Side" – 5:11
"Black Orchid" – 6:32

CD 2
"For My Brother" – 6:22
"Breakfast After 10" – 5:17
"Calling You" – 4:15
"Italian Radio" – 4:22
"Somebody" – 4:25
"Razorblade" – 4:37
"Chameleon Boy" – 6:52
"James" – 6:13
"Amazing" – 6:30
"Weight of the World" – 4:03
"PRN" – 5:20
"Come in Closer" – 5:12 (featuring guest vocalist Zayra Alvarez)
"The Sound of Pulling Heaven Down" – 1:45

DVD
In addition to the live concert, the DVD bonus features included the following sections:
Confessionals, in which fans share stories about how Blue October's music has touched their lives.
Sidewalk Chalk, in which singer/songwriter Justin Furstenfeld tells the stories behind the songs of History for Sale.
Soundcheck, featuring an early version of the Foiled track "She's My Ride Home".
Radio, which features videos of Blue October's various live-on-radio performances. 
Video, which includes music videos of "Calling You" and "Razorblade".
"18th Floor Balcony", the last song of the concert was included on the DVD but not the CD.

Personnel
Justin Furstenfeld - lead vocals, rhythm guitar
Jeremy Furstenfeld - drums, backing vocals
C.B. Hudson - lead guitar, backing vocals
Ryan Delahoussaye - violin, mandolin, keyboard, backing vocals
Piper Skih - bass guitar, midi pedals, backing vocals
Zayra Alvarez - vocals
Paul J. Armstrong - camera operator
Michael Cain - executive producer
David Castell - production, mixing, audio engineering, sound design
David Jack Daniels - mixing
Edwin A. Harris - editing
Chuck Hatcher - photography
Chad Wandel - Cover Photo
Elijah Wandel - Cover Model 
Rick Kirkham - camera operator
Mike Swinford - executive producer
King Hollis - director

References

Blue October albums
2004 live albums
Universal Records live albums
Live video albums
2004 video albums
Universal Records video albums
Albums produced by David Castell